The Evansville Courier & Press is a daily newspaper based in Evansville, Indiana. It serves about 30,000 daily and 50,000 Sunday readers.

History
The Evansville Courier was founded in 1845 by William Newton, a young attorney. Its first issue was printed two years before the city had a charter. The Evansville Press was founded in 1906 by Edward W. Scripps as an afternoon daily. 

Both papers were separate and fierce competitors until 1937, when the Evansville Press was flooded and the Evansville Courier agreed to print their competitor's paper. In 1938, the two papers formed a joint operating agreement to handle business affairs. The two papers retained separate staffs and editorial policies, but published a joint Sunday edition with two editorial pages from the two papers. 

The E. W. Scripps Company sold the Press and bought the Courier in 1986.  The joint Sunday edition was replaced by a Sunday edition of the Courier.  The two newspapers continued to publish separate editions until the Evansville Press was discontinued as a separate newspaper on December 31, 1998. The Courier was renamed the Courier & Press. 

In 2015, the newspaper was purchased by Gannett.

Reputation and awards 
In 2002, 2004, 2011 and 2017 the newspaper was named the state's "Blue Ribbon Daily" by the Hoosier State Press Association. The newspaper was a finalist for the same award in 2009 and 2010. In 2005, the Courier & Press photography staff won the Pictures of the Year International "Best Use of Photography" Award for papers with circulation under 100,000. In 2010, staff photographer Denny Simmons was named the Indiana News Photographers Association (INPA) Photographer of the Year. In 2019, staff photographer Sam Owens was named the Indiana News Photographers Association (INPA) Photographer of the Year.

The newspaper is known for its dedication to community service and commitment to education. As part of the newspaper's 150th anniversary, it planted 150 trees on the University of Southern Indiana campus. In recent years, the Courier & Press has introduced several new community recognition events. They include the 20 Under 40 award for emerging community leaders and Star Students, which salutes 90 outstanding high school juniors in southwest Indiana, west-central Kentucky and southeastern Illinois.

Notable contributors
Karl Kae Knecht, cartoonist and photographer
Edward J. Meeman, began his journalism career at the Evansville Press as a $4 a week cub reporter; later edited the Memphis Press-Scimitar and encouraged environmental reporting

References

External links

Newspapers of Southwestern Indiana
Newspapers published in Indiana
Gannett publications
Mass media in Evansville, Indiana
Daily newspapers published in the United States
Publications established in 1845
1845 establishments in Indiana